The 71st Regiment Indiana Infantry was an infantry regiment that served in the Union Army during the American Civil War.

Service
The 71st Indiana Infantry was organized at Terre Haute, Indiana, beginning July 21, 1862, and mustered in for three years service August 18, 1862, at Indianapolis under the command of Lieutenant Colonel Melville D. Topping.

The regiment left Indiana for Lexington, Kentucky and was assigned to the 1st Brigade, Army of Kentucky.

The 71st Indiana Infantry ceased to exist on February 22, 1863, when its designation was changed to the 6th Indiana Cavalry.

Detailed service
Nearly every man of the regiment was captured at the Battle of Richmond, August 30, 1862. Paroled, they returned to Indianapolis to await being exchanged. The regiment was reorganized through December 1862 and again sent into Kentucky.  The regiment was captured in action at Muldraugh Hill, Kentucky, on December 29, 1862, paroled, and returned to Indiana to once again await being exchanged. It was during this time that the regiment was changed from infantry to cavalry; it remained on duty in Indianapolis until August 26, 1863.

Commanders
 Lieutenant Colonel Melville D. Topping - commanded at the Battle of Richmond; killed in action

See also

 6th Regiment Indiana Cavalry
 List of Indiana Civil War regiments
 Indiana in the Civil War

References
 Dyer, Frederick H. A Compendium of the War of the Rebellion (Des Moines, IA: Dyer Pub. Co.), 1908.
 Hitchcock, Henry. History of Company E: Being Also the History of the 71st Regiment Indiana Volunteers (Indianapolis: Wm. S. Cameron), 1863.
Attribution
 

Military units and formations established in 1862
Military units and formations disestablished in 1863
Units and formations of the Union Army from Indiana
1862 establishments in Indiana